Mytilinidion is a genus of fungi in the family Mytilinidiaceae. The genus was described by Swiss clergyman and botanist Jean Étienne Duby in 1861.

Species
Mytilinidion acicola
Mytilinidion aggregatum
Mytilinidion andinense
Mytilinidion australe
Mytilinidion carpinaceum
Mytilinidion decipiens
Mytilinidion dubyi
Mytilinidion gemmigenum
Mytilinidion juniperi
Mytilinidion kamatii
Mytilinidion mytilinellum
Mytilinidion oblongisporum
Mytilinidion parvulum
Mytilinidion resinae
Mytilinidion resinicola
Mytilinidion rhenanum
Mytilinidion scolecosporum
Mytilinidion thujae
Mytilinidion thujarum
Mytilinidion tortile

References

Mytilinidiales
Dothideomycetes genera